Richards Island is one of the Canadian arctic islands within the Northwest Territories, Canada. Its eastern limit is marked by the main channel of the Mackenzie River, while its western limit is defined by the narrower Reindeer Channel.

Richards Island was named by John Richardson in 1826 after the Governor of the Bank of England, John Baker Richards. The island, while desolate, is home to some major oil and gas sites.

References

Uninhabited islands of the Northwest Territories